Brittons Swamp is a rural locality in the local government area (LGA) of Circular Head in the North-west and west LGA region of Tasmania. The 2016 census recorded a population of 50 for the state suburb of Brittons Swamp.

History 
Brittons Swamp was gazetted as a locality in 1973. 

An early settler named Britton established a sawmill in the area. It was later used as a soldier settlement.

Geography
Many of the boundaries are survey lines.

Road infrastructure 
Route A2 (Bass Highway) runs through from north-east to south-west.

References

Towns in Tasmania
Localities of Circular Head Council